The 2016 NCAA Division I Men's Golf Championship was the 78th annual tournament to determine the national champions of NCAA Division I men's collegiate golf. It was contested from May 27 to June 1 at the Eugene Country Club in Eugene, Oregon. Host team Oregon won 3–2 over Texas and Aaron Wise of Oregon won the individual competition.

Qualifying
The five teams with the lowest team scores qualified from each of the six regional tournaments for both the team and individual national championships.
The lowest scoring individual not affiliated with one of the qualified teams in their regional also qualified for the individual national championship.

Regional tournaments

Team competition

Leaderboard

Remaining teams: Clemson (867), Georgia (867), TCU (867), Auburn (868), Florida State (868), Houston (868), Virginia (869), Alabama (871), Wake Forest (871), San Diego State (872), South Florida (876), Baylor (880), Stanford (884), Purdue (898), UAB (902).

After 54 holes, the field of 30 teams was cut to the top 15. Five teams were tied for 14th place and Louisville and Oklahoma advanced over Clemson, Georgia, and TCU based on fifth player scorecards, a new tie-break system.

Match play bracket
The eight teams with the lowest total scores advanced to the match play bracket.

Source:

Individual competition

The field was cut after 54 holes to the top 15 teams and the top nine individuals not on a top 15 team. These 84 players competed for the individual championship.

References

NCAA Men's Golf Championship
Golf in Oregon
NCAA Division I Men's Golf Championship
NCAA Division I Men's Golf Championship
NCAA Division I Men's Golf Championship
NCAA Division I Men's Golf Championship
NCAA Division I Men's Golf Championship